Donald Stoker (30 December 1922 – 1 December 1985) was an English footballer who represented Great Britain at the 1956 Summer Olympics. Stoker played as an amateur for Kingstonian and Sutton United, and went on to manage Sutton for a brief period. He then moved on to Walton & Hersham and managed them for 8 years, winning the Surrey Senior Cup twice.

References

External links
 

1922 births
1985 deaths
English footballers
Sutton United F.C. players
Footballers at the 1956 Summer Olympics
Olympic footballers of Great Britain
Sutton United F.C. managers
Kingstonian F.C. players
Association football defenders